The Javadhu Hills (also Jawadhi, Jawadhu Hills) ( Rainfall clouds producing Hills For North Tamilnadu) ( Ooty of Vellore and Tirupattur ) are an extension of the Eastern Ghats spread across parts of Tirupattur (earlier part of Vellore District) and Tiruvannamalai districts in the northern part of the state of Tamil Nadu in southeastern India. This range separates Tirupattur and Tiruvannamalai districts. Tirupattur district lies on the north-western side and Tiruvannamalai district lies on the south-eastern side of this range. The towns of Tirupattur, Vaniyambadi and Ambur of Tirupattur district are located on the north western side and the towns of Chengam and Polur of Tiruvannamalai district are located on the south eastern side.

The hills consist of bluish-gray granites, with peaks averaging 3,800–4,000 feet (1,300–1,350 m). About 50 miles (80 km) wide and 20 miles (32 km) long, they are bisected into eastern and western sections by the Cheyyar and Agaram rivers, tributaries of the Palar. "The Barahmahal hills to the west are somewhat bare, but the Jawadhi are clothed in verdure to the very summit on the east: towards sunset the whole range puts on a purple tinge like heather bloom. The sharper shadows mark out minor ranges and valleys, which in the midday merge in the mass of the range, and beyond Bommaikuppam, looking from Tirupatur, a silvery cascade may be seen, shining bright in the setting sun.".
8
During the British colonisation of India, the Javadhu Hills appeared occasionally in government gazetteers and manuals, ethnographies, and travelers' accounts. Henry le Fanu, writing in 1883, admired the beauty of the Jawadhi hills.

The Indian astronomer Vainu Bappu selected the hills as the site of the Kavalur Observatory (VBO), which began operations in 1967. 

There are few tourist places near Javadhu Hills; Beemanmadavu waterfalls is one of the most frequented one.

Jamanamarathur is one of the larger villages in these hills, populated with around 10,000. With an altitude of 857m, it is the second village in height in Javadhi hills in Tiruvannamali district. One can reach Jamanamarathur, from west – Tirupattur or Vaniyambadi , from east – Polur and from South Chengum.

Highest peak : 1,400 m.

Way : ● Vellore ● Polur ● Alangayam ● Tirupattur.

Nearest City Corporation : ● Vellore.

Nearest airport : Vellore Airport

Cultivation in the Javadi Hills
The hills are sparsely populated; the majority of the inhabitants are Malayali tribes people, though other castes are also present. 

Malayali tribes people grow a variety of trees on their patta land, including tamarind, jackfruit, gooseberry, guava, pomegranate, mango, lemon, coconut, plantain, Paddy, Saamai etc.

The trees of the Javadhi Hills also produce a range of forest products. These include millettia pinnata, Smilax regelii, Castor oil plant

They are noted both for their fruit bearing trees, medicinal and for their sandalwood. Presently (2012), there are no sandalwood trees remaining due to illegal logging. This theft was going on for many years.

Access
Javadhu hill range is large, and thinly populated. Many peaks and valleys have tribal settlements. Jamuna Marathur is the most populated in the range, located centrally.

By Road : Chennai-Arcot-Arni-Polur-Jamuna Marathur.(JavvadhuHills)

By Road : Chennai-Arcot-Kannamangalam-Amirthi-Jamuna Marathur.(JavvadhuHills)

By Road : Tirupattur-Alangayam-Jamuna Marathur.(JavvadhuHills)

By Road : Bangalore-Krishnagiri-Tirupattur-Alangayam-Jamuna Marathur.(JavvadhuHills)

By Road : Vellore-Vanniyambadi-Alangayam-Jamuna Marathur.(JavvadhuHills)

By Road : Vellore-Amirthi-Jamuna Marathur.(JavvadhuHills)(Shortest route)

From Chennai Take NH4, Chennai-Poonamallee Bypass- Arcot and take Arni road, after Arni Bypass take the Polur Road, upon reaching Polur town, ask the route for Aththimur and after Aththimur one can see the sign boards for Jamuna Marathur.
The weather and roads are very nice, thanks to Tamil Nadu government and its state highways department for maintaining the roads in good condition. Please Avoid driving at night or dark hours Safe timing for travelling is 6am-5pm, After polur town To jamuna marathur 40 km of Ghat roads, mostly one cannot see any shops or even people.  But it is mind blowing road. Places like Bheeman falls have become alcohol drinking spot for the tourist groups, so not so safe for families unless law and order is enforced.

References

Hills of Tamil Nadu
South Deccan Plateau dry deciduous forests